In graph theory, a minimum cut or min-cut of a graph is a cut (a partition of the vertices of a graph into two disjoint subsets) that is minimal in some metric.

Variations of the minimum cut problem consider weighted graphs, directed graphs, terminals, and partitioning the vertices into more than two sets.

The weighted min-cut problem allowing both positive and negative weights can be trivially transformed into a weighted maximum cut problem by flipping the sign in all weights.



Without terminal nodes
The minimum cut problem in undirected, weighted graphs limited to non-negative weights can be solved in polynomial time by the Stoer-Wagner algorithm. In the special case when the graph is unweighted, Karger's algorithm provides an efficient randomized method for finding the cut. In this case, the minimum cut equals the edge connectivity of the graph.

A generalization of the minimum cut problem without terminals is the minimum -cut, in which the goal is to partition the graph into at least  connected components by removing as few edges as possible.

With terminal nodes
When two terminal nodes are given, they are typically referred to as the source and the sink. In a flow network, the minimum cut separates the source and sink vertices and minimizes the total sum of the capacities of the edges that are directed from the source side of the cut to the sink side of the cut. As shown in the max-flow min-cut theorem, the weight of this cut equals the maximum amount of flow that can be sent from the source to the sink in the given network.

In a weighted, undirected network, it is possible to calculate the cut that separates a particular pair of vertices from each other and has minimum possible weight. A system of cuts that solves this problem for every possible vertex pair can be collected into a structure known as the Gomory–Hu tree of the graph.

A generalization of the minimum cut problem with terminals is the -terminal cut, or multi-terminal cut.

Applications
Graph partition problems are a family of combinatorial optimization problems in which a graph is to be partitioned into two or more parts with additional constraints such as balancing the sizes of the two sides of the cut. Segmentation-based object categorization can be viewed as a specific case of normalized min-cut spectral clustering applied to image segmentation. It can also be used as a generic clustering method, where the nodes are data samples assumed to be taken from a metric space and edge weights are their distances.

Due to max-flow min-cut theorem, 2 nodes' Minimum cut value is equal to their maxflow value. In this case, some algorithms used in maxflow problem could also be used to solve this question.

Number of minimum cuts
A graph with  vertices can at the most have  distinct minimum cuts.
This bound is tight in the sense that a (simple) cycle on  vertices has exactly  minimum cuts.

See also
 Maximum cut
 Vertex separator, an analogous concept to minimum cuts for vertices instead of edges

References

Graph theory objects
Network flow problem